Allochernes is a genus of pseudoscorpions belonging to the family Chernetidae.

The genus was first described by Beier in 1932.

The species of this genus are found in Europe and Japan.

Species:
 Allochernes aetnaeus Beier, 1975
 Allochernes bactrinus Dashdamirov & Schawaller, 1995

References

Chernetidae
Pseudoscorpion genera